Ibn al-Jayyāb al-Gharnāṭī; Abū al-Ḥasan ‘Alī b. Muḥammad b. Suleiman b. ‘Alī b. Suleiman b. Ḥassān al-Anṣārī al-Gharnāṭī; Spanish var., Ibn al-Ŷayyab, (1274–1349 AD/673–749 AH); he was an Andalusian writer, poet and minister from the Nasrid court of Granada Ansari, in modern-day Spain.  

He was of Arab heritage descending from the Ansar tribe and was born in Granada, where he grew up and became involved with a group of distinguished scholars in that city. He later chaired the Writers Cabinet of Granada.  He died of the Black Death plague in Granada.

His substantial legacy of poetry and prose was posthumously collated by his many students, among whom was Lisan al-Din ibn al-Khaṭīb, who succeeded him as vizier.

He wrote his qasidas (poems) in a neo-classical style, and some  still decorate the walls of the summer palace of the Nasrid sultans, now the property of Generalife.

Bibliography
Ibn Al-Ŷayyab, El Otro Poeta De La Alhambra, by Rubiera Mata, Maria Jesus,, ed. Patronato de La Alhambra, 1994
Etude d'une scenographie poetique: l'oeuvre d'Ibn al-Jayyab a la tour de la Captive (Alhambra) by Sophie Makariou, in: Studia Islamica, No. 96, Ecriture, Calligraphie et Peinture (2003), pp. XXV-XXVII+95-107

Writers from al-Andalus
1274 births
1349 deaths
Scholars of the Nasrid period
13th-century Arabs
14th-century Arabs
14th-century Arabic writers
Viziers of the Emirate of Granada
14th-century deaths from plague (disease)